Joanna Pacitti (born October 6, 1984) is an American singer and former lead vocalist in the band City (Comma) State.

Career

Theater
In 1996, at age 12, Pacitti was chosen to star in the 20th anniversary revival of the musical Annie after entering a contest sponsored by the department store Macy's. Pacitti starred in 106 performances with the national tour.

Shortly before the show was to open on Broadway, she was terminated by the show's producers. After successfully appealing the initial rejection of her case, Pacitti eventually settled out of court on undisclosed terms.

Music career
Pacitti began pursuing a pop career in her teenage years. When she was 14 years old, Michelle Young met her and was impressed by her demo tapes. Young introduced her to various people in the music business, ultimately resulting in a five-year record deal with Ron Fair of A&M records.

In 2003, Pacitti was one of three participants in MTV's First Year, which detailed the process of obtaining various professions over the course of a year. Pacitti is seen attempting to launch a music career in the show.

In 2004, she appeared in an episode of What I Like About You, in which she played a singer named Amber, and sang her song "Ultraviolet."

Pacitti's first single "Let It Slide" was finally released in May 2006 by Geffen Records, and went to radio at the end of June. Her debut album This Crazy Life was released on August 15, 2006, debuting at No. 31 on the Billboard Heatseekers chart.

Throughout 2006 she toured with Sheryl Crow and Nick Lachey, and joined Teen People's Rock'n’Shop Tour in July.

During the first half of 2007, Pacitti recorded the song "Out from Under" for the Bratz: Motion Picture Soundtrack.

When Geffen Records underwent budgetary downsizing in 2007, Joanna was cut from the label. She had been working on a follow-up to This Crazy Life at the time.

American Idol
Pacitti auditioned for the eighth season of American Idol in Louisville, Kentucky, in an episode that aired on January 21, 2009. She passed the audition into the Hollywood round. Her career leading up to this event has caused some debate about whether American Idol contestants should be strictly amateur performers.

On the February 11 Idol broadcast, she was advancing into the Top 36. Fox issued a press release the next morning announcing that Pacitti was "ineligible to continue," and was removed from the competition. According to Star magazine, the reason behind this was that Pacitti had "very personal connections" to Michelle Young and Roger Widynowski, two executives that worked at the Los Angeles office of American Idol'''s 19 Entertainment.  She was replaced on the program by Felicia Barton.

Performances

Discography

Albums

Singles
"Let It Slide" (2006)

Soundtracks
 2001 Legally Blonde Soundtrack – "Watch Me Shine"
 2002 Cadet Kelly Soundtrack – "Watch Me Shine"
 2003 My Scene Chelsea Mix – "Just When You're Leaving" (different version from the album version, Promotional Only Release)
 2004 First Daughter Soundtrack – "Fall"
 2007 Nancy Drew Soundtrack – "Pretty Much Amazing"
 2007 Bratz: Motion Picture Soundtrack'' – "Out From Under"

References

External links

 Joanna's Facebook Profile
 Joanna's Official MySpace

1984 births
American child singers
American women singer-songwriters
American Idol participants
American television actresses
Musicians from Philadelphia
American people of Italian descent
Living people
Singer-songwriters from Pennsylvania
21st-century American women singers
21st-century American singers